Quirke may refer to:

People
Alan Quirke (born 1976), Irish Gaelic footballer
Antonia Quirke , British film critic
Dave Quirke (born 1947), Irish former professional football (soccer) player
John Quirke (born 1950), South Australian parliamentarian
Johnny Quirke (1911–1983), Irish hurler
Kieron Quirke, English writer
Micheál Quirke (born 1980), Irish Gaelic footballer
Michael Quirke (born 1991), English footballer
Pauline Quirke (born 1959), English actress
Percy Quirke (1898–1972), Australian politician
Stephen Quirke, British Egyptologist
William Quirke (c. 1896–1955), Irish politician

Others
Quirke (series), a series of crime novels by Benjamin Black
Quirke (TV series), a British/Irish television series on BBC One and RTÉ One in 2014 based on the novels
Quirke Mine

See also
Quirk (disambiguation)